Smooth beardtongue or smooth penstemon is a common name for several plants and may refer to:

Penstemon digitalis, native to eastern North America
Penstemon laevigatus, native to the eastern United States
Penstemon subglaber, native to the western United States